Illusion Studios S.A. (styled as ILLUSIONSTUDIOS) is an Argentine entertainment company. It produces content for children and young people and is known for creating Top Cat: The Movie (Don Gato y su Pandilla), Gaturro, and Peter Punk. Since its release of Boogie, Illusion Studios becomes the first ever company in Hispanic America to release a 3D film. As of 2013, it is currently unknown what state the company is in.

Featured media

Films

TV shows

Other

Alliances
The company also made an alliance with the following companies:

Entertainment companies of Argentina